The following is a list of episodes of the Channel 5 (UK) and Reelz (US) documentary series Autopsy: The Last Hours of....

Season 1 (January 7, 2014 – January 21, 2014)

Season 2 (July 24, 2014 – August 7, 2014)

Season 3 (December 2, 2014 – May 13, 2015)

Season 4 (September 28, 2015 – December 10, 2015)

Season 5 (January 30, 2016 – February 27, 2016)

Season 6 (March 19, 2016 – April 2, 2016)

Season 7 (November 19, 2016 – February 25, 2017)

Season 8 (May 20, 2017 – July 22, 2017)

Season 9 (February 11, 2018 – October 6, 2018)

Season 10 (February 10, 2019 - December 29, 2019)

Season 11 (February 16, 2020 - December 13, 2020)

Season 12 (April 11, 2021 - August 1, 2021)

Season 13 (May 1, 2022 - )

See also
Lists of people by cause of death
List of deaths from drug overdose and intoxication

Notes

External links
 
 
 

Lists of American non-fiction television series episodes
Lists of British non-fiction television series episodes
Lists of people by cause of death